Newtown-Annandale was an electoral district of the Legislative Assembly in the Australian state of New South Wales. It was created in 1950, mainly succeeding Newtown and Annandale. It was abolished in 1953.

Members for Newtown-Annandale

Election results

1950

References

Newtown-Annandale